= Speed limits in Austria =

Informational sign showing the standard speed limits for cars in Austria

The general speed limits in Austria are as follows:

General Speed limits
Type of road	Urban	Rural	Expressway	Motorway
Cars, vans and motorcycles	50 km/h (31 mph)	100 km/h (62 mph)	100 km/h (62 mph)	130 km/h (81 mph)
Cars and vans with light trailers (less than 750 kg)	50 km/h (31 mph)	100 km/h (62 mph)	100 km/h (62 mph)	100 km/h (62 mph)
Cars and vans with heavy trailers (over 750 kg)	50 km/h (31 mph)	80 km/h (50 mph)	80 km/h (50 mph)	80 km/h (50 mph)
Heavy goods vehicles (over 3.5 t)	50 km/h (31 mph)	70 km/h (43 mph)	80 km/h (50 mph)	80 km/h (50 mph)
Buses	50 km/h (31 mph)	80 km/h (50 mph)	100 km/h (62 mph)	100 km/h (62 mph)
